Double Dee is an Italian dance music duo who scored one hit, "Found Love", which spent a week at #1 on the U.S. Hot Dance Music/Club Play chart in 1990.  The single did not chart on the Billboard Hot 100 but did reach #64 on the Airplay chart.

Members of the group were Davide Domenella and Donato "Dany" Losito.  "Found Love" was officially credited to 'Double Dee featuring Dany'.  "Found Love" was re-issued in 1995, reaching number 33 in the UK Singles Chart.  A further single release, "Shining" was a minor hit in 2003.

In Argentina, a cover of "Found Love" called "Fue Amor" by Jazzy Mel was a major hit in the early 1990s.

Discography

Singles

See also
List of number-one dance hits (United States)
List of artists who reached number one on the US Dance chart

References

Italian house music groups